The AN/PSN-11 Precision Lightweight GPS Receiver (PLGR, colloquially "plugger") is a ruggedized, hand-held, single-frequency GPS receiver fielded by the United States Armed Forces. It incorporates the Precise Positioning Service — Security Module (PPS-SM) to access the encrypted P(Y)-code GPS signal.

Introduced in January 1990, and extensively fielded until 2004 when it was replaced by its successor, the Defense Advanced GPS Receiver (DAGR). In that time period more than 165,000 PLGRs were procured worldwide, and despite being superseded by the DAGR, large numbers remain in unit inventories and it continues to be the most widely used GPS receiver in the United States military. 

The PLGR measures 9.5 by 4.1 by 2.6 inches  and weighs  with batteries. It was originally delivered to the United States military with a six-year warranty; however, this was extended to ten years in June 2000.

Versions
AN/PSN-11 — NSN 5825-01-374-6643, an early version (tan case)
AN/PSN-11(V)1 "Enhanced PLGR" — NSN 5825-01-395-3513, an upgraded version (green case)

See also
Defense Advanced GPS Receiver
Selective availability anti-spoofing module

References

https://web.archive.org/web/20110722183355/https://gps.army.mil/gps/CustomContent/gps/ue/plgr.htm
http://www.rockwellcollins.com/news/gallery/gov/navigation/page2997.html
http://www.ion.org/museum/files/PLGR-9~1.PDF
http://www.prc68.com/I/PLGR.shtml] — Brooke Clarke's PLGR page

Global Positioning System
Military equipment of the United States
Military electronics of the United States
Military equipment introduced in the 1990s